Harry David "Moose" Miller (July 28, 1923 – April 18, 2007) was an American professional basketball player. He played one season for the Toronto Huskies of the Basketball Association of America (BAA).

Miller, a 6'4" center and forward, played collegiately at Seton Hall and attended the University of North Carolina at Chapel Hill while in the U. S. Marine Corps. He then played one season in the BAA for the Toronto Huskies in the 1946–47 season and has the distinction of playing in the first game of what would become the National Basketball Association (NBA). Miller averaged 2.9 points per game in 55 appearances in his sole season in the league.  He played the next season with the Atlanta Crackers of the upstart Professional Basketball League of America, averaging 4.0 points per game in four contests.

After his playing career, Miller coached at the high school (Derry Area High School), junior college (Westmoreland County Community College) and college (Saint Vincent College) levels in Western Pennsylvania. He died on April 18, 2007.

Miller's son Mark Miller is a mixed martial arts competitor.

BAA career statistics

Regular season

References

External links
 

1923 births
2007 deaths
American expatriate basketball people in Canada
American men's basketball players
United States Marine Corps personnel of World War II
Basketball players from New York City
Centers (basketball)
Deaths from kidney failure
High school basketball coaches in Pennsylvania
Forwards (basketball)
People from Latrobe, Pennsylvania
Professional Basketball League of America players
Seton Hall Pirates men's basketball players
Seton Hall Preparatory School alumni
Sportspeople from Brooklyn
Toronto Huskies players
University of North Carolina at Chapel Hill alumni